Walter James Lenoir House is a historic home located near Yadkin Valley, Caldwell County, North Carolina.  It was built in 1893, and is a two-story, "T"-shaped, frame I-house with late Victorian decorative detailing.  It has a two-story rear ell and two-tier, gabled porch.

The house was listed on the National Register of Historic Places in 2004.

References

Houses on the National Register of Historic Places in North Carolina
Victorian architecture in North Carolina
Houses completed in 1893
Houses in Caldwell County, North Carolina
National Register of Historic Places in Caldwell County, North Carolina